A list of books and essays about George Cukor:

Cukor